is a Latin phrase that translates literally as "Oh the times! Oh the customs!", first recorded to have been spoken by Cicero. A more natural, yet still quite literal, translation is "Oh what times! Oh what customs!"; a common idiomatic rendering in English is "Shame on this age and on its lost principles!", originated by the classicist Charles Duke Yonge.

The phrase was used by the Roman orator Cicero in four different speeches, of which the earliest was his speech against Verres in 70 BC. The most famous instance, however, is in the second paragraph of his First Oration against Catiline, a speech made in 63 BC, when Cicero was consul (Roman head of state), denouncing his political enemy Catiline. In this passage, Cicero uses it as an expression of his disgust, to deplore the sorry condition of the Roman Republic, in which a citizen could plot against the state and not be punished in his view adequately for it. The passage in question reads as follows:

Cicero is frustrated that, despite all of the evidence that has been compiled against Catiline, who had been conspiring to overthrow the Roman government and assassinate Cicero himself, and in spite of the fact that the Senate had given its senatus consultum ultimum, Catiline had not yet been executed. Cicero goes on to describe various times throughout Roman history where consuls saw fit to execute conspirators with less evidence, in one instance—the case of former consul Lucius Opimius' slaughter of Gaius Gracchus (one of the Gracchi brothers)—based only on : "mere suspicion of disaffection".

Cultural references 
In later classical times Cicero's exclamation had already become famous, being quoted for example in Seneca the Elder's :

Martial's poem "To Caecilianus" (Epigrams §9.70) also makes reference to the First Catilinarian Oration:

In modern times this exclamation is still used to criticize present-day attitudes and trends, but sometimes is used humorously or wryly. Even in the eighteenth century it began being used this way: an aquatint print of 1787 by Samuel Alken after Thomas Rowlandson in the British Royal Collection entitled  shows two old men surprised to find three young drunk men who had fallen asleep together at a table.

Edgar Allan Poe used the phrase as the title and subject of his poem, "O, Tempora! O, Mores!" (≈1825), in which he criticized the manners of the men of his time. It is pronounced by a drunken poet in the 1936 movie Mr. Deeds Goes to Town. The expression is used in both the play (1955) and movie (1960) Inherit the Wind, a fictional account of the Scopes Trial, in which it is uttered by the cynical reporter, Hornbeck, referring to the town's attitude towards Darwin's theory of evolution. 

The musical comedians Flanders and Swann used the term when Flanders proclaimed " – Oh Times, Oh Daily Mirror!" (1964). It is also one of several Latin phrases found in Asterix and Obelix comics published in the 1960s and 1970s. The phrase is also used in the Doctor Who serial, The Romans (1964).

In November 2014, senator Ted Cruz of Texas used the opening of Cicero's First Catilinarian Oration on the U.S. Senate floor, with only a few words changed, to criticize President Barack Obama's use of executive orders. In his version of the speech, which followed the translation of Charles Duke Yonge, senator Cruz rendered the phrase  as "Shame on the age and on its lost principles!"; and in place of Catiline, then-President Obama.

See also 

Catiline Orations 
Ecphonesis
Mores
Tempora mutantur

References

Catiline
Cicero
Latin words and phrases